Roy J. McDonald (born April 12, 1947) is a Republican politician and former member of the New York State Legislature who represented the 43rd District in the New York State Senate and Districts 100 and 112 in the New York State Assembly. McDonald served as Town and County Supervisor for the Town of Wilton, New York for 23 years. Following his tenure as Supervisor, McDonald served in the Assembly from 2002 to 2008 and served in the Senate from 2009 to 2012.

McDonald is notable as one of four Republican members of the New York State Senate that voted in favor of the Marriage Equality Act in 2011. In 2012, he was defeated in a Republican primary by his eventual successor, Kathy Marchione.

Political career

For 23 years, McDonald was Town and County Supervisor for the Town of Wilton, New York and in 1986, served a term as Chairman of the Saratoga County Board of Supervisors. His two grandsons have autism, and McDonald has been a leader regarding autism awareness, creating the Saratoga County Autism Council and sponsoring legislation. Before being elected to the New York State Senate in District 43 on November 4, 2008, McDonald had served in the New York State Assembly since 2002, representing the 100th and 112th Districts, respectively. During McDonald's tenure, Senate District 43 included all of Rensselaer County and part of Saratoga County.

Sen. McDonald lost his bid for re-election to the Senate in 2012; he was defeated by Kathleen Marchione in a Republican primary.

2011 same-sex marriage vote

On June 16, 2011, McDonald spoke to the press on his intended support for New York State's upcoming vote on same-sex marriage.  In response to the pressure he was receiving from other Republicans to vote against the measure, he is quoted as saying:
You get to the point where you evolve in your life where everything isn't black and white, good and bad, and you try to do the right thing. You might not like that. You might be very cynical about that. Well, fuck it, I don't care what you think. I'm trying to do the right thing. I'm tired of Republican-Democrat politics. They can take the job and shove it. I come from a blue-collar background. I'm trying to do the right thing, and that's where I'm going with this.

When same-sex marriage legislation was passed by the Senate on June 24, 2011, Senator McDonald voted "yes."  McDonald had previously voted "no" on same-sex marriage legislation in 2009. McDonald was one of four Republican state senators to vote in favor of the bill.

Following his vote in favor of same-sex marriage, McDonald and the three other Republican senators who voted in favor of the bill saw a massive increase in fundraising, which included money generated from an event hosted by New York City Mayor Michael Bloomberg.

2012 re-election campaign

On March 18, 2012, the Saratoga County Republican Party County Committee declined to renominate Senator McDonald for re-election. McDonald did receive the support of the Independence Party of New York.

On April 4, 2012, Saratoga County Clerk Kathleen Marchione announced that she would challenge McDonald in a Republican primary in Senate District 43.  One writer commented that the McDonald-Marchione primary contest "could prove to be one of the state's most hotly contested races because of McDonald's recent voting pattern, notably his votes to enact same-sex marriage and Gov. Andrew Cuomo's tax plan."

After a primary contest that was variously described as "divisive", "bitter," and "nasty," the results of the McDonald-Marchione race were initially too close to call.  Marchione declared victory on September 25, 2012, while McDonald's campaign announced that the senator was considering his options. Marchione defeated McDonald by 99 votes. Later that week, Gov. Andrew Cuomo, a Democrat, weighed in on the race by announcing his support for McDonald to continue his re-election bid on a third-party line. Following his primary defeat, McDonald opted to cease his campaign and throw his support to Marchione, stating that he was "very proud of [his] time in public service" and that "[s]tanding up for the communities [he] represented was always [his] first priority". Marchione went on to win the general election on November 6, 2012, defeating Democrat Robin Andrews and McDonald (who received 20,929 votes on the Independence Party line despite having suspended his campaign).

Following McDonald's loss in his 2012 primary, a Newsday headline described the senator as "a political casualty of same-sex marriage."

References

External links

New York State Senate: Roy J. McDonald
Saratoga County Council on Autism
Roy McDonald Albany Times Union Blog

1947 births
Living people
Town supervisors in New York (state)
Republican Party members of the New York State Assembly
Republican Party New York (state) state senators
People from Lansingburgh, New York
State University of New York at Oneonta alumni
People from Wilton, New York
People from Saratoga, New York
21st-century American politicians
United States Army soldiers